The 1988 WTA Aix-en-Provence Open doubles was a division of the 1988 WTA Aix-en-Provence Open. Nathalie Herreman and Catherine Tanvier were the defending champions and won in the final 6–4, 7–5 against Sandra Cecchini and Arantxa Sánchez.

Seeds
Champion seeds are indicated in bold text while text in italics indicates the round in which those seeds were eliminated. All eight seeded teams received byes into the second round.

Draw

Final

Top half

Bottom half

References
 1987 WTA Aix-en-Provence Open Doubles Draw

WTA Aix-en-Provence Open
1988 WTA Tour